Mikro may refer to:
 Mikro (author), pseudonym of South African author Christoffel Hermanus Kühn (1903–1968)
 Mikro (Greek band), a Greek electronic music group formed in 1998
 Mikro (gastropod), a genus of sea snails

See also

 
 Micro (disambiguation)
 Macro (disambiguation)
 Mikra (disambiguation)